The Sunken Meadow State Parkway (also known as the Sunken Meadow Parkway or the Sunken Meadow) is a  long parkway in Suffolk County, Long Island, New York. Located entirely within the town of Smithtown, the parkway begins at a cloverleaf interchange with the Northern State Parkway (exits 44–45) and the northern terminus of the Sagtikos State Parkway. The parkway, which continues north, is a northern spur of the Sagtikos, which opened in September 1952. The northern end of the parkway is at the toll barrier in exit SM5 in the Kings Park section of Smithtown. From there, the road continues north through Sunken Meadow State Park to a roundabout at the Long Island Sound. The parkway comprises the northern half of New York State Route 908K (NY 908K, an unsigned reference route), with the Sagtikos State Parkway forming the southern portion. Commercial vehicles are, like on most parkways, prohibited from using the Sunken Meadow, except for a portion north of NY 25A in Kings Park.

Due to land use restrictions in Nassau County, Sunken Meadow was the first park east of New York City, because provisions for a parkway would be near impossible to build. Construction of the parkway commenced after the Sagtikos opened in September 1952, with the interchange at the Northern State Parkway. The first portion opened to traffic in November 1954 from the Northern State/Sagtikos to NY 25, with a slated completion in 1956. The parkway was completed in April 1957, opening on the 1st. As part of the parkway opening, improvements were made to Sunken Meadow State Park, including expanded vehicle capacity and a longer boardwalk. In 2001, the Sunken Meadow was proposed in a study to receive a widening, which would include new bus and carpool lanes.

Route description

The Sunken Meadow State Parkway begins at exit 44–45 off the Northern State Parkway, a cloverleaf interchange that also serves as the northern terminus of the Sagtikos State Parkway. Southbound, this interchange is designed as exit SM1. After the Northern State, the Sunken Meadow continues northeast on the right-of-way used by the Sagtikos, crossing through Commack. Passing west of Valmont Village Park, the four-lane parkway crosses under New Highway, bending northeast through Commack, becoming a divided parkway as it enters exit SM2. This exit, which is only served northbound, connects the Sunken Meadow to NY 454 (Veterans Memorial Highway) via Harned Road, a local street in Commack. The four-lane parkway continues northward through Commack, crossing under NY 454 a short distance after the interchange. At the overpass, the westbound entrance from NY 454 connects to the southbound Sunken Meadow.

Immediately after crossing under NY 454, the Sunken Meadow State Parkway continues northward into exit SM3, which serves as a cloverleaf interchange with NY 25 (Jericho Turnpike). The four-lane parkway continues north out of the interchange, immediately entering exit SM3A, which northbound connects to County Route 14 (CR 14; Indian Head Road). Southbound, this interchange serves Old Indian Head Road, and is signed as part of exit SM2. After exit SM3A, the Sunken Meadow bends northeast, becoming a divided highway once again, crossing through Commack. The parkway bends north once again, crossing under Scholar Lane before paralleling Old Commack Road under Old Northport Road. After a bend to the northeast, the parkway enters Kings Park.

In Kings Park, the Sunken Meadow State Parkway bends northward, crossing under the Long Island Rail Road's Port Jefferson Branch and entering exit SM4. Exit SM4 is a cloverleaf interchange that serves CR 11  (Pulaski Road / East Northport Road). After the interchange with CR 11, the Sunken Meadow  enters Fort Salonga as a four-lane parkway with a wide median, bending northeast into exit SM5. Exit SM5, the last on the Sunken Meadow, is a cloverleaf interchange with NY 25A (Fort Salonga Road). After crossing over NY 25A, the Sunken Meadow State Parkway enters Sunken Meadow State Park at a toll barrier in the middle of the interchange. The toll barrier serves as the northern terminus of the Sunken Meadow State Parkway, while the right-of-way continues north through Sunken Meadow State Park, terminating at a roundabout near the Long Island Sound.

History

Sunken Meadow State Park began as several parcels of land owned by the town of Smithtown that were combined to form the park. When the park first opened in 1928, it was  large. This land had been given to the state by a public vote of 493–436 (for vs. against) with promises of a new parkway and expanded facilities. Due to restrictive land usage in Nassau County for a parkway, Robert Moses and the Long Island State Park Commission announced that the burden of providing a beach on the northern shore of Long Island rested on Sunken Meadow State Park. However, no funding had been received for the new parkway, which had been requested.

The Sunken Meadow State Parkway was considered as one part of three spurs of the Sagtikos State Parkway, which bridged the eastern gap of the Long Island parkway system. Then designated the Sunken Meadow Spur, the route was to connect the Northern State and Sagtikos to Sunken Meadow State Park. The Sagtikos State Parkway opened on September 29, 1952 with provisions for the Sunken Meadow State. Originally when the park opened, an entrance was placed on a remote section of NY 25A in Fort Salonga.

Slated with a 1956 completion date, the first  from the Northern State to NY 25 (Jericho Turnpike) opened on November 29, 1954, with the landscaping at NY 25 incomplete. The LISPC believed that Sunken Meadow State Park, when the parkway was finished, was to become the second-most used park on Long Island, behind Jones Beach State Park.

With the opening of the new parkway, the Long Island Parks Commission expanded Sunken Meadow State Park to handle the additional traffic. The commission added four new parking lots, which brought capacity on the parkway from 3,000 vehicles to 7,500 vehicles. A new overlook was constructed, which also had the capacity for 1,250 more vehicles. A new cafeteria, extensions of the then- boardwalk another , along with other new facilities valued at $1 million (1957 USD) were also constructed.

From 1997–2001, engineers worked on a $6.5 million (2001 USD) study that would expand Long Island's transportation system by 2020.

Exit list

References

External links

 Sunken Meadow State Parkway Article from NYCROADS.com
 New York State Parks: Sunken Meadow State Park
 New York State Parks: Nissequogue River State Park

Parkways in New York (state)
Roads on Long Island
Robert Moses projects
Transportation in Suffolk County, New York